The Niğde Stele is a Neo-Hittite monument from the modern Turkish city of Niğde, which dates from the end of the 8th century BC.

Discovery 

The stele was found on 27 September 1975 near the Citadel of Niğde in the Çelebi Hüsamettin Bey Mosque (now Dışarı Camii), where it was lying carved side down in a doorway as a lintel stone. Today it is displayed in the Niğde Archaeological Museum with inventory number 22.1.75.

Description 
The black basalt stele is 2.18 metres high and about a metre wide and belongs to a type which developed in the 10th century BC. It depicts the weather god Tarhunzas, holding an axe and a thunderbolt in his raised hands. Vines sprout from the ground to his left and grain to the right, similar to the İvriz relief. A very similar depiction of the same god appears on the relief in the village of Gökbez, some 22 km to the south. The figure is depicted with clothing, hair and beard of the Assyrian style. The winged solar disk, a traditional symbol of the ruler, hovers over his head.

On the right edge of the stone block is an inscription in Luwian hieroglyphs. On it the author, Muwaharanis, writes that he had the stele erected in honour of Tarhunzas and identifies himself as a king and son of king Warpalawas. John David Hawkins gives the following translation:

This Tarhunzas Muwaharanis [ma]de (?), the Hero, the King, loved by Tarhunzas (and) the gods, the son of Warpalawas, the Ruler, the Hero.

Muwaharanis was the successor of his father Warpalawas on the throne of the late Luwian kingdom of Tuwana, a successor state of the Hittite , in the southern part of the modern Niğde Province. Since it is known that Warpalawas was reigning in 709 BC, the relief must date some time after that year. Thus the stele is the latest known and datable example such a relief and possibly the latest known Luwian inscription - only the Karatepe Bilingual might be later.

References

Bibliography 
 John Boardman (Ed.): The Cambridge Ancient history. Plates to volume III : the Middle East, the Greek world and the Balkans to the sixth century B.C. Cambridge University Press, Cambridge 1984 pp. 85–87

External links 
 hittitemonuments.com

Archaeological discoveries in Turkey
Hittite art
8th-century BC steles
Luwian inscriptions
Ancient Cilicia
History of Niğde Province
Steles in Turkey
1975 archaeological discoveries